The site of the former RAF Misson, Nottinghamshire, is located  south-east of Doncaster, South Yorkshire, and approximately  south-east of the former RAF Finningley airfield.

History
The site was used as a bombing range by the Operational Training Units (OTUs) of RAF Finningley until 1948. Between October 1960 and June 1963, No 94 (Surface to Air Missile) Squadron (No 94 (SAM) Sqn) RAF operated on the site with Bristol Bloodhound I missiles under the control of the Tactical Command Centre at RAF Lindholme.

Current use
The site is now private property but the concrete stands are still visible from the area. L. Jackson & Co.Ltd is situated on the site and supplies surplus military vehicles and equipment. The former site is proposed as a fracking location for the extraction of natural gas.

See also
List of former Royal Air Force stations

References

External links

Royal Air Force stations in Nottinghamshire
Royal Air Force stations of World War II in the United Kingdom